Marvin Hewitt (born 1922) was an American impostor who became, among other things, a university physics professor.

Hewitt was a high school drop-out with no qualifications who wanted to become an academic. He always used names and identities of real-life people in his impostures. He later claimed that he had a "compulsion to teach".

Hewitt's first imposture began in 1945 when he selected a famous name from a list of university teachers and used it to apply for a position of an aerodynamic engineer. However, the name was too recognizable and he was soon exposed.

The next identity Hewitt adopted was that of Julius Ashkin, a physics professor. He applied and was accepted first into a pharmacological college in Philadelphia and the next year into teacher's college in Minnesota. When he began to gain academic fame, the real Ashkin wrote him to suggest that he stop.

Hewitt proceeded to adopt the persona of Georg Hewitt, former chief researcher of Radio Corporation of America. When he was found out, he switched to that of philosophy professor Clifford Berry.

In 1954, Hewitt was on his fifth teaching job as Dr. Kenneth Yates, an associate professor of physics at the University of New Hampshire. At that stage two other colleges had discovered that his credentials were false when they noticed that the real Kenneth Yates was currently working for an oil company. They had only removed him from the faculty and the university authorities had decided to let him leave quietly when the details leaked out.

References

The Compulsion. Time magazine. March 15, 1954
Honest career for Ph(ony)D: brilliant hoaxer Marvin Hewitt becomes a respected engineer. Life magazine. January 21, 1957, pp. 57–82.

1922 births
Possibly living people
Impostors
People who fabricated academic degrees